Roman Petrov (born 19 September 1991) is a Kyrgyzstani fencer.

Career 
He competed at the 2013 World Fencing Championships and at the 2014 World Fencing Championships. He received Master of Sport of International Class in Kyrgyzstan following his notable performances at the 2014 Asian Championships. He represented Kyrgyzstan at the 2014 Asian Games which was his maiden appearance at the Asian Games. During the 2014 Asian Games, he competed in both men's individual épée and men's team épée events. He also made his second Asian Games appearance during the 2018 Asian Games.

He represented Kyrgyzstan at the 2020 Summer Olympics which also marked his debut appearance at the Olympics. During the 2020 Summer Olympics, he competed in the men's épée event.

References

External links
 

1991 births
Living people
Kyrgyzstani male épée fencers
Fencers at the 2014 Asian Games
Fencers at the 2018 Asian Games
Fencers at the 2020 Summer Olympics
Olympic fencers of Kyrgyzstan
Asian Games competitors for Kyrgyzstan
Sportspeople from Bishkek
Kyrgyzstani people of Russian descent
Sportspeople from Vyborg
Islamic Solidarity Games medalists in fencing
Islamic Solidarity Games competitors for Kyrgyzstan
20th-century Kyrgyzstani people
21st-century Kyrgyzstani people